Syllomatia is a genus of moths belonging to the subfamily Tortricinae of the family Tortricidae.

Species
Syllomatia pertinax (Meyrick, 1910)
Syllomatia pirastis (Meyrick, 1910)
Syllomatia xythopterana (Meyrick, 1881)

See also
List of Tortricidae genera

References

External links
tortricidae.com

Tortricinae
Tortricidae genera